Three Rivers Press is the trade paperback imprint of the Crown Publishing Group, a division of Random House. It publishes original paperback titles as well as paperback reprints of books issued initially in hardcover by the other Crown imprints.

History 
The Crown Publishing Group launched its first paperback imprint, Crown Trade Paperbacks, in 1992. Five years later, the imprint decided to re-brand itself as Three Rivers Press, named for the Harlem, East and Hudson rivers that border Manhattan, as well as the three hardcover imprints (Crown, Harmony, and Clarkson Potter) that initially fed the list. In 2010, Three Rivers began the paperback publisher for Crown Archetype and Harmony Books.

References

Crown restructuring complete
Dreams from My Father: A Story of Race and Inheritance by Barack Obama
New York Times Best Seller list

External links
Three Rivers Press

Book publishing companies based in New York (state)
Publishing companies established in 1992